The following is a list of fastest laps for the Indianapolis 500. The fastest lap statistic has been officially kept for the Indianapolis 500 since 1950. The honor is held in somewhat minor prestige, and typically a cash prize is awarded to the driver who accomplishes the feat. However, it is typically considered a peripheral award, and no championship bonus points are currently awarded for fastest lap.

Since records have been kept, the fastest lap has been achieved by the leader on the final lap of the race on one occasion (Bobby Rahal, 1986). It has never been accomplished on the first lap of the race. It is commonly done by a driver not leading the race at the time, due to drafting.

History
From 1950 to 1960, the Indianapolis 500 awarded points towards the World Championship of Drivers. During those eleven races, the driver setting the fastest lap received championship points towards the world title.

Fastest lap chart

 All-time record race lap speed.

1990: Emerson Fittipaldi and Arie Luyendyk tied for fastest lap to three decimal places.

References

Indianapolis Star & news 500 Mile Race Record Book (2002)

Fastest lap